West Frisian, or simply Frisian (  or ;  , also ), is a West Germanic language spoken mostly in the province of Friesland in the north of the Netherlands, mostly by those of Frisian ancestry. It is the most widely spoken of the Frisian languages.

In the study of the evolution of English, West Frisian is notable as being the most closely related foreign tongue to the various dialects of Old English spoken across the Heptarchy, these being part of the Anglo-Frisian branch of the West Germanic family.

Name 
The name "West Frisian" is only used outside the Netherlands, to distinguish this language from the closely related Frisian languages of Saterland Frisian and North Frisian spoken in Germany.

History

Old Frisian
In the early Middle Ages the Frisian lands stretched from the area around Bruges, in what is now Belgium, to the river Weser, in northern Germany. At that time, the Frisian language was spoken along the entire southern North Sea coast.

Old Frisian bore a striking similarity to Old English. This similarity was reinforced in the late Middle Ages by the Ingvaeonic sound shift, which affected Frisian and English, but the other West Germanic varieties hardly at all. Both English and Frisian are marked by the suppression of the Germanic nasal in a word like us, soft or goose: see Ingvaeonic nasal spirant law. Also, when followed by some vowels the Germanic k developed into a ch sound. Modern English and Frisian on the other hand have become very divergent, largely due to wholesale Norse and French imports into English and similarly heavy Dutch and Low German influences on Frisian.

One major difference between Old Frisian and modern Frisian is that in the Old Frisian period ( – ) grammatical cases still occurred. Some of the texts that are preserved from this period are from the 12th or 13th, but most are from the 14th and 15th centuries. Generally, these texts are restricted to legal documents. Although the earliest definite written examples of Frisian are from approximately the 9th century, there are a few runic inscriptions from the region which are probably older and possibly in the Frisian language. These runic writings, however, usually do not amount to more than single- or few-word inscriptions, and cannot be said to constitute literature as such. The Middle Frisian language period ( – ) is rooted in geopolitics and the consequent fairly abrupt halt in the use of Frisian as a written language.

Middle Frisian and New Frisian
Until the 16th century, West Frisian was widely spoken and written, but from 1500 onwards it became an almost exclusively oral language, mainly used in rural areas. This was in part due to the occupation of its stronghold, the Dutch province of Friesland, in 1498, by Albert III, Duke of Saxony, who replaced West Frisian as the language of government with Dutch.

This practice was continued under the Habsburg rulers of the Netherlands (Charles V, Holy Roman Emperor, and his son Philip II, King of Spain). When the Netherlands became independent in 1585, West Frisian did not regain its former status, because Holland rose as the dominant part of the Netherlands and its language, Dutch, as the dominant language in judicial, administrative and religious affairs.

In this period the Frisian poet Gysbert Japiks (1603–1666), a schoolteacher and cantor from the city of Bolsward, who largely fathered modern West Frisian literature and orthography, was an exception to the rule.

His example was not followed until the 19th century, when entire generations of Frisian authors and poets appeared. Therefore, the New Frisian period is considered to have begun at this time, around 1820.

Speakers 

Most speakers of West Frisian live in the province of Friesland in the north of the Netherlands. Friesland has 643,000 inhabitants (2005), of whom 94% can understand spoken West Frisian, 74% can speak West Frisian, 75% can read West Frisian, and 27% can write it.

For over half of the inhabitants of the province of Friesland, 55%, West Frisian is the native language. In the central east, West Frisian speakers spill over the province border, with some 4,000–6,000 of them actually living in the province of Groningen, in the triangular area of the villages Marum, De Wilp, and Opende.

Also, many West Frisians have left their province in the last 60 years for more prosperous parts of the Netherlands. Therefore, possibly as many as 150,000 West Frisian speakers live in other Dutch provinces, particularly in the urban agglomeration in the West, and in neighbouring Groningen and newly reclaimed Flevoland.

A Frisian diaspora exists abroad; Friesland sent more emigrants than any other Dutch province between the Second World War and the 1970s. Frisian is still spoken by some Dutch Canadians, Dutch Americans, Dutch Australians and Dutch New Zealanders.

Apart from the use of West Frisian as a first language, it is also spoken as a second language by about 120,000 people in the province of Friesland.

West Frisian is considered by UNESCO to be a language in danger of becoming extinct, officially listed as "vulnerable".

Status 

In 1951, Frisian language activists, protesting at the exclusive use of Dutch in the courts, caused a riot in Leeuwarden. The resulting inquiry led to the establishment of a committee of inquiry. This committee recommended that the Frisian language should receive legal status as a minority language. Subsequently, the Use of Frisian in Legal Transactions Act of 11 May 1956 was passed, which provided for the use of Frisian in transactions with the courts.

Since 1956, West Frisian has an official status along with and equal to Dutch in the province of Friesland. It is used in many domains of Frisian society, among which are education, legislation, and administration. In 2010, some sixty public transportation ticket machines in Friesland and Groningen added a West Frisian-language option.

Although in the courts of law the Dutch language is still mainly used, in the province of Friesland, Frisians have the right to give evidence in their own language. Also, they can take the oath in Frisian in courts anywhere in the Netherlands.

Primary education in Friesland was made bilingual in 1956, which means West Frisian can be used as a teaching medium. In the same year, West Frisian became an official school subject, having been introduced to primary education as an optional extra in 1937. It was not until 1980, however, that West Frisian had the status of a required subject in primary schools, and not until 1993 that it was given the same position in secondary education.

In 1997, the province of Friesland officially changed its name from the Dutch form  to the West Frisian . So far 4 out of 18 municipalities have changed their official geographical names from Dutch to West Frisian. Some other municipalities, like Heerenveen and the 11 towns, use two names (both Dutch and West Frisian) or only a West Frisian name.

Within ISO 639 West Frisian falls under the codes fy and fry, which were assigned to the collective Frisian languages.

Relations with Dutch and English

With Dutch
The mutual intelligibility in reading between Dutch and Frisian is poor. A cloze test in 2005 revealed native Dutch speakers understood 31.9% of a West Frisian newspaper, 66.4% of an Afrikaans newspaper and 97.1% of a Dutch newspaper. However, the same test also revealed that native Dutch speakers understood 63.9% of a spoken Frisian text, 59.4% of a spoken Afrikaans text and 89.4% of a spoken Dutch text, read aloud by native speakers of the respective languages.

Folklore about relation to English

The saying "As milk is to cheese, are English and Fries" describes the observed similarity between Frisian and English. One rhyme that is sometimes used to demonstrate the palpable similarity between Frisian and English is "Bread, butter and green cheese is good English and good Fries", which sounds not very different from "".

Another rhyme on this theme, "" (in English, "Butter, bread and green cheese, whoever can't say that is no genuine Frisian") was used, according to legend, by the 16th century Frisian rebel and pirate Pier Gerlofs Donia as a shibboleth that he forced his captives to repeat to distinguish Frisians from Dutch and Low Germans.

Language examples 

Here is a short example of the West Frisian language in comparison with English, Old English, and Dutch.

Internal classification 
Not all Frisian varieties spoken in Dutch Friesland are mutually intelligible. The varieties on the islands are rather divergent, and Glottolog distinguishes four languages:
Hindeloopen-Molkwerum Frisian
Schiermonnikoog Frisian
Westlauwers–Terschellings
Terschelling Frisian
Western Frisian (mainstream Mainland West Frisian)

The dialects within mainstream mainland West Frisian are all readily intelligible. Three are usually distinguished:
Clay Frisian (Klaaifrysk dialect)
Wood Frisian (Wâldfrysk dialect, incl. Westereendersk)
South or Southwest Frisian (Súdhoeks dialect)

The  ("South Western") dialect, which is spoken in an area called  ("the Southwest Corner"), deviates from mainstream West Frisian in that it does not adhere to the so-called newer breaking system, a prominent grammatical feature in the three other main dialects.

The  ("Northern") dialect, spoken in the north eastern corner of the province, does not differ much from Wood Frisian.

By far the two most-widely spoken West Frisian dialects are Clay Frisian and Wood Frisian. Both these names are derived from the Frisian landscape. In the western and north-western parts of the province, the region where Clay Frisian is spoken, the soil is made up of thick marine clay, hence the name. While in the Clay Frisian-speaking area ditches are used to separate the pastures, in the eastern part of the province, where the soil is sandy, and water sinks away much faster, rows of trees are used to that purpose.  The natural landscape in which Wâldfrysk exists mirrors The Weald and North Weald areas of south-eastern England – the Germanic words wald and weald are cognate, as is the more generic wood.

Of the two,  probably has more speakers, but because the western clay area was originally the more prosperous part of the mostly agricultural province,  has had the larger influence on the West Frisian standardised language.

Dialectal comparison
There are few if any differences in morphology or syntax among the West Frisian dialects, all of which are easily mutually intelligible, but there are slight variances in lexicon.

Phonological differences

The largest difference between the Clay Frisian and Wood Frisian dialects are the words my ("me"), dy ("you"), hy ("he"), sy ("she" or "they"), wy ("we"), and by ("by"), which are pronounced in the Wood Frisian as mi, di, hi, si, wi, and bi and in Clay Frisian as mij, dij, hij, sij, wij, and bij.  Other differences are in the pronunciation of the diphthongs ei, ai, and aai which are pronounced ij, ai, and aai in Wood Frisian, but ôi, òi, and ôi in Clay Frisian. Thus, in Wood Frisian, there is no difference between ei and ij, whereas in Clay Frisian, there is no difference between ei and aai.

Other phonological differences include:

Lexical differences
Some lexical differences between Clay Frisian and Wood Frisian include:

Alphabet

West Frisian uses the Latin alphabet. A, E, O and U may be accompanied by circumflex or acute accents.

In handwriting, IJ (used for Dutch loanwords and personal names) is written as a single letter (see IJ (digraph)), whereas in print the string IJ is used. In alphabetical listings IJ is most commonly considered to consist of the two letters I and J, although in dictionaries there is an entry IJ between X and Z telling the user to browse back to I.

Phonology

Grammar

See also
 Frisia
 Frisian languages
 Frisian Islands
 Frisians
 Frisian literature
 Languages of the Netherlands
  Swadesh list with English and Frisian words

References

Further reading

External links
 
 ISO 639 code set entry for "fry" and for "fri" (active and retired language codes, respectively)
 Course West Frisian
 Wet gebruik Friese taal (2013). overheid.nl. - 2013 legislation concerning the Frisian language

 
Languages of the Netherlands
Culture of Groningen (province)